The Solidarity Party is a political party in Thailand founded on 10 March 1983 by Thawi Kaikub. Originally called the Prachathai Party, the name was changed to the Ruamthai Party in 1986, and later changed again to the Solidarity Party.

List of Leaders 

Narong Wongwan (19 January 1989 - 1 June 1991)
 Boonchu Rojanastien (27 June 1991 - 20 July 1992)
 Uthai Pimchaichon (20 July 1992 - 21 August 1995)
 Chaiyos Sasomsub (29 August 1995 - 13 November 2000)
 Chartwat Chartkornkul (1 December 2000 - 17 January 2002)

References 

Defunct political parties in Thailand